Frank George Griffith Carr (23 April 1903 – 9 July 1991) CB, CBE, MA, LLB, FSA, was director of the National Maritime Museum, Greenwich, England from 1947 to 1966 and was responsible for restoring and preserving a large number of ships, such as the Cutty Sark and the Gypsy Moth IV. After retirement he was involved in the creation of the Maritime Trust and the World Ship Trust which served the purpose of preserving old ships.

Life 
Frank Carr fell in love with sailing barges as a boy of 10. He acquired his first boat, a skiff-dinghy, in 1918. He used this vessel, the Maud, to explore the broads, fens and estuaries of East Anglia.

He was educated at The Perse School and Trinity Hall, Cambridge. While he was studying for his law degree at Cambridge, his first job was on a barge travelling between Ipswich and Antwerp in 1928. On graduation, he became assistant librarian at the House of Lords Library. He began research for his first book, Sailing Barges, published in 1931.

He continued sailing and his book A Yachtsman's log tells of the voyages made to the Baltic, Spain, and the British coastline in his Bristol Channel Pilot Cutter Cariad.

After serving in the RNVR during the Second World War, he was appointed director of the National Maritime Museum in 1946 where he supervised and oversaw its growth while also incorporating a number of other historic parts of Greenwich. He resigned from the museum in 1966 in controversial circumstances.

He served on the council of the Society for Nautical Research and was made its Honorary Vice-President.

He was a founder and chairman of the World Ship Trust (1978) and largely responsible for the survival of the Cutty Sark.

Carr was awarded the CBE (1954) and was made a CB (1967).

He died 9 July 1991, survived by his wife Ruth. A memorial service was held in the chapel of the Old Royal Naval College, Greenwich in October.

Publications 
Sailing Barges (1931, 5th edition 1989)
Vanishing craft (1934)
A Yachtsman's log (1935)
Yacht master’s guide and coastal companion (1940)
The Cutty Sark and the days of sail (c1962)
Maritime Greenwich (1974)
Gypsy Moth IV (c1981)

References 

1903 births
1991 deaths
Directors of the National Maritime Museum
Academics of the Royal Naval College, Greenwich
Alumni of Trinity Hall, Cambridge
People educated at The Perse School
British maritime historians
Companions of the Order of the Bath